Izaic Yorks (born April 17, 1994) is an American middle-distance and long-distance runner. Yorks won 1500 m at 2018 NACAC Championships. As a Washington Huskies, Izaic Yorks is an eight-time NCAA Division 1 All-American cross country and Track and field runner.

Professional
Izaic Yorks signed with Brooks in June 2016.

The Men's race featured four Furman Elite athletes battling it out with Brooks Beasts' Izaic Yorks. Caleb Hoover would be the eventual victor in 7:52.07, dragging the next four men under the 8 minute barrier with him.

Yorks placed 3rd at the 2017 Sir Walter Miler Men's Elite Mile in 3:58.57.

Izaic Yorks is working as a Special Olympics Ambassador "because working with people in the community who have disabilities of any kind has been ingrained in my life. My sister is in a wheel chair and has had some developmental challenges to overcome. When I was asked it was easy to say yes."

NCAA
Izaic Yorks won back to back 1500 m Pac-12 Champion titles in 2015 and 2016. Yorks is an eight-time NCAA Division 1 All-America as a Washington Huskies. He is the 2015 and 2016 track and field MPSF mile champion.

Prep
Yorks competed for Lakes High School where he won the 1,600 meter 2012 Washington Interscholastic Activities Association 3A state title in 4:04.77, and won the 800-meter state title in a school record time of 1:50.56 (ranked 16th USA High School).

Yorks set Lakes High School records in 
 800 meters: 1:50.56
 1500 meters: 4:00.10
 1600 meters: 4:04.00 (Washington state record)
 Mile: 4:04.38
 3200 meters: 	9:05.43

Yorks finishing eighth in 4:04.38 at the 2012 Jim Ryun Dream Mile in New York.

Yorks placed fourth at the 2011 Nike Cross Nationals Championships in Portland.

Yorks placed third at the 2011 Washington Interscholastic Activities Association 3A cross country state meet(15:05 – 5 km).

Reference list

External links

 
 
 
 
 

1994 births
Living people
American male middle-distance runners
Track and field athletes from Michigan
American male long-distance runners
University of Washington alumni
Washington Huskies men's track and field athletes
Track and field athletes from Seattle